Zambia has qualified to the FIFA Women's World Cup in one occasion, the 2023 FIFA Women's World Cup which will also be the country's debut, making the country the first landlocked nation in Africa to qualify for a senior World Cup in either gender. Previously, Zambia has come close to qualify for the FIFA Women's World Cup, but fell short in two occasions, occurred in 2014 and 2018.

FIFA Women's World Cup

World Cup participation

2023 FIFA Women's World Cup

References

 
World Cup
Countries at the FIFA Women's World Cup